Lucette Valensi (born 1936) is a French historian née Lucette Chemla in Tunis.

Biography 
After obtaining her bachelor's degree in history from the Sorbonne in 1958, she became a history and geography agrégée in 1963 then docteur d'État in early modern period in 1974.
She began her teaching and research career in Tunisia between 1960 and 1965. She also remains an associate member of the Centre de recherches historiques.

In February 1979, she was one of 34 signatories of the declaration written by Léon Poliakov and Pierre Vidal-Naquet to dismantle Robert Faurisson's negationist rhetoric.

She has a daughter, Jeanne, and two grandsons: Elie Ruderman and Gabriel Ruderman, also known as Edi Rudo, a magician and mime.

Awards 
 Chevalier of the Légion d'honneur
 Commandeur of the Ordre des Palmes académiques
 Officier of the Ordre tunisien du Mérite culturel.

Publications 
Le Maghreb avant la prise d'Alger, Paris, Éditions Flammarion, 1969.
Fellahs tunisiens: l'économie rurale et la vie des campagnes aux 18e et 19e siècles, Paris, Mouton, 1977.
On the Eve of Colonialism: North Africa Before the French Conquest, London, Africa publications, 1982
The Last Arab Jews. The communities of Djerba, Tunisia, Harmond Academic Publishers, 1984 ("The last Arab Jews"), translated under the title Juifs en terre d'Islam. Les communautés de Djerba, Éditions des Archives contemporaines, 1985, in collaboration with Abraham L. Udovitch.
Mémoires Juives (with Nathan Wachtel), Paris, Éditions Gallimard, 1986
Fables de la mémoire la glorieuse bataille des trois rois, Paris, Éditions du Seuil, 1992
La Fuite en Égypte : Histoires d'Orient & d'Occident, Paris, Seuil, 2002
 
 L'Islam, l'islamisme et l'Occident : Genèse d'un affrontement (with Gabriel Martinez-Gros), Paris, Seuil, 2004
 Venise et la Sublime Porte : La naissance du despote, Hachette, 2005
 Mardochée Naggiar : Enquête sur un inconnu, Paris, Stock, 2008.
 Ces étrangers familiers, Paris, Payot, 2012
Juifs et musulmans en Algérie, Paris, Tallandier, 2016

References

Bibliography

External links 
  

20th-century French historians
21st-century French historians
People from Tunis
1936 births
Living people
Chevaliers of the Légion d'honneur
Commandeurs of the Ordre des Palmes Académiques